Mobilabium hamatum, commonly known as hook-leaf, is the only species in the genus Mobilabium from the orchid family, Orchidaceae. It is an epiphytic orchid with between three and twelve stiff, oblong leaves with a hooked tip. There are up to fifteen star-shaped, cream-coloured, pale green or brownish flowers with red or purple markings. The labellum has three lobes with the middle lobe hollow and containing sticky nectar. It mainly grows on rainforest trees at higher altitudes and is found in tropical North Queensland.

Description
There is a hinge between the column and the labellum, the latter with three lobes. The middle lobe is rounded and hollow, containing sticky nectar. Flowering occurs from July to August.

Taxonomy and naming
Mobilabium hamatum was first formally described in 1946 by Herman Rupp and the description was published in The North Queensland Naturalist. The type specimen was sent to Rupp by Thomas Edgar Hunt who called it "hookey leaf" and whose brother "R.Hunt" had collected it. The name Mobilabium is derived from the Latin words mobilis meaning "mobile" and labium meaning "lip". The specific epithet (hamatum) is a Latin word meaning "with hooks" or "hooked".

Distribution and habitat
It is found in north Queensland between the Cedar Bay National Park and Townsville.

See also
 List of Orchidaceae genera

References

Endemic orchids of Australia
Orchids of Queensland
Monotypic Epidendroideae genera
Vandeae genera
Aeridinae
Plants described in 1946